Below is a list of Blue Flag beaches and marinas in Wales, sorted by regulatory body. As of September 2022, 53 locations had been designated by the internationally recognised Foundation for Environmental Education based in Copenhagen, Denmark. The foundation awards, or removes, beaches and marinas from their list each July.

The 2022 is up 13,  beaches. In the past the reduced number was due to stricter water quality criteria being used, coupled with the fact that 2012 was a wet year in the country meaning that there were more naturally occurring bacteria present. In comparison, the larger countries of England and Scotland had 55 and 3 beaches listed and no marinas. The Welsh organisation Keep Wales Tidy helps to keep the beaches in good condition as well as running two separate sets of awards - the Green Coast Award and the Seaside Award.

The vast majority of the beaches and marinas are located on the Wales Coast Path.

Local Authority Maintained
 Anglesey -	Benllech
 Anglesey -	Holyhead (m)
 Anglesey -	Llanddona
 Anglesey -	Llanddwyn, Newborough
 Anglesey -	Porth Dafarch
 Anglesey -	Porth Swtan / Church Bay
 Anglesey -	Trearddur Bay
 Bridgend - Rest Bay, Porthcawl
 Carmarthenshire - Cefn Sidan, Pembrey Country Park
 Ceredigion - Aberporth
 Ceredigion - Borth
 Ceredigion - New Quay, Harbour
 Ceredigion - Tresaith
 Conwy - Llandudno North Shore
 Gwynedd -   Abersoch 
 Gwynedd -	Dinas Dinlle
 Gwynedd -	Morfa Bychan (Black Rock Sands) ^
 Gwynedd -	Marian y De, Pwllheli
 Pembrokeshire -	Amroth
 Pembrokeshire -	Broad Haven North
 Pembrokeshire -	Coppet Hall ^
 Pembrokeshire -	Dale
 Pembrokeshire -	Lydstep
 Pembrokeshire -	Newgale
 Pembrokeshire -	Saundersfoot
 Pembrokeshire -	Whitesands, St Davids
 Pembrokeshire -	Tenby, Castle
 Pembrokeshire -	Tenby, North
 Pembrokeshire -	Tenby, South
 Swansea -	Bracelet Bay ^
 Swansea - 	Caswell Bay
 Swansea -	Langland Bay
 Swansea -	Port Eynon
 Swansea -	Swansea Marina (m)
 Vale of Glamorgan -	Penarth Marina (m)
Legend

Privately Maintained
 Caernarfon Harbour Trust - Victoria Dock, Caernarfon (m)
 Parkdean Holidays - Trecco Bay
 Yacht Haven Management - Hafan Pwllheli (m)	
Legend

References

Water and the environment
Environmental standards
Beaches of Wales
Blue Flag Beaches
Lists of beaches in the United Kingdom